Hermanus or Hermannus Angelkot Jr. (bapt. 6 February 1688, Amsterdam – d. 1727) was an Amsterdam pharmacist who also wrote poems and plays. He was the son of Judith Muijsart and Hermanus Angelkot Sr. (ca. 1648 - ca. 1713), who also wrote plays and practised as a pharmacist. The sources often cite father and son interchangeably. Hermanus Jr. married Catharina te Naerde in Amsterdam before 1717.

Angelkot Jr. was friendly with Pieter Langendijk who was the first to translate Molière into Dutch. Together they wrote Cato, of de ondergang der Roomsche vryheid (1715), based on Joseph Addison's Cato, a Tragedy (1713), dedicating it to the then mayor of Amsterdam, Nicolaes Witsen.

Works 
 Vechter
 Het voutje van Esphesen
 Cato, of de ondergang der Roomsche vryheid (1715, with Pieter Langendijk)

References

External links 
 

1688 births
1727 deaths
Dutch male poets
18th-century Dutch dramatists and playwrights
Dutch pharmacologists
Writers from Amsterdam
Dutch male dramatists and playwrights